Derek Dallas Carr (born March 28, 1991) is an American football quarterback for the New Orleans Saints of the National Football League (NFL). He played college football at Fresno State, where he twice received first-team All-MWC honors, and was selected by the Oakland Raiders in the second round of the 2014 NFL Draft. 

A four-time Pro Bowler, Carr helped the Raiders reach the playoffs during the 2016 season, the franchise's first appearance since 2002, as well as another postseason berth in 2021. Following a 2022 season that missed expectations, Carr lost his starting job and agreed with Raiders leadership to be released following the conclusion of the season. He left the Raiders as the franchise leader in passing yards, passing touchdowns, and pass completions.

Early years
Carr was born in Bakersfield, California, the youngest of three children to Rodger and Sheryl Carr. He and his family lived in Bakersfield before relocating to Sugar Land, Texas, in 2002 when his oldest brother, David Carr, became the first overall draft pick of the then-expansion Houston Texans. Carr and his family moved back to Bakersfield for his senior year, and he attended Bakersfield Christian High School.

Carr's high school football career began at Clements High School in Sugar Land, Texas. After playing on the freshman team his first year, he became a backup quarterback on the varsity team as a sophomore. He did not prepare himself to become the starting quarterback, but a preseason injury to another quarterback thrust him into the role.

Carr made gradual progress as a starter for the Clements High School Rangers. He passed for 1,246 yards and 12 touchdowns as a sophomore, and 1,622 yards and 16 touchdowns as a junior. While a junior, Carr led his team to an undefeated 13–0 season (playoffs included) before losing in the quarterfinals of the 2007 Class 5A Division 2 State playoffs in Region 3 to the (also undefeated) Katy High School Tigers, the eventual champions. Also during his junior year, Carr was heavily recruited. His college choices included Fresno State, SMU, Boise State, the University of Southern California, UCLA, and Utah. Of these schools, only Fresno State, SMU, and Utah made a scholarship offer to Carr. Ultimately, he verbally committed to Fresno State on May 25, 2008, at the end of his junior year. Carr was the program's first recruit of the 2009 class.

In 2008, Bakersfield Christian High School athletic director and former NFL player Doug Barnett confirmed that Carr would transfer to BCHS, amid rumors that he would have gone to nearby Stockdale High School or Bakersfield High School, two schools with historically good football programs.

As a senior, Carr led the Eagles football team to a 12–1 record and the California Interscholastic Federation Central Section Division V championship; the only blemish came at home against Oaks Christian High School, a national football powerhouse, during the team's season opener. On October 29, 2008, Carr was selected by ESPN RISE as the National Football Player of the Week after passing for 441 yards and three touchdowns in a game against Tehachapi High School five days earlier. Carr would eventually set a Central Section record by throwing 544 yards in a win against Arvin High School on November 7, 2008. Carr was also selected by The Bakersfield Californian as the 2008 All-Area Football Player of the Year. Carr also set a new school record when he passed for six touchdowns and ran for two in a blowout win against small school Fowler High at home. After his high school football career finished, Carr was named the National Player of the Year by the National Private Schools Athletic Association in 2009.

High school statistics

College career

2009 and 2010 seasons
Carr enrolled as an early-entry freshman for the spring semester at Fresno State, where his brother David also played quarterback, in 2009 so he could participate in spring football with the Bulldogs. Then–Fresno State head coach Pat Hill stated that Carr, a true freshman, was "in the mix" for the starting quarterback position as late as mid-July. However, days before the 2009 season began in September, Hill announced junior Ryan Colburn would start over Carr. Carr appeared in five games as a freshman in limited action.

Colburn continued to be the Bulldogs' starter going into 2010.After redshirting his 2010 season, Carr took over the starting quarterback position for Fresno State in the fall of 2011.

2011 season
Carr earned his opportunity to start for the Bulldogs in their 4–9 season in 2011. He made his first appearance as starter in the Bulldogs' season-opening loss to California. Three weeks later, Carr had a breakout game in a victory over Idaho with 371 passing yards, five touchdowns, and two interceptions. Six games later, on November 12 in a loss to New Mexico State, he had a season-high 391 passing yards and three touchdowns. In the 2011 season, Carr passed for 3,544 passing yards, 26 touchdowns, and nine interceptions. He was among the passing leaders of the Western Athletic Conference in numerous categories.

2012 season
Going into the season, Carr had a new head coach in Tim DeRuyter, who replaced the fired Pat Hill. Carr helped lead the Bulldogs to a significant improvement, going 9–4 in 2012. Going into the season, Davante Adams was coming off a redshirt and he instantly became a reliable target for Carr.

After splitting the first two games of the season, Carr passed for 300 yards, five touchdowns, and one interception in a victory over Colorado on September 15. Two weeks later, Carr had a career game in a 52–40 victory over San Diego State. He passed for a school-record tying 536 yards, five touchdowns, and two interceptions. On October 27. in a game on the road against New Mexico, he had 416 yards, four touchdowns, and one interception in the 49–32 victory. In the Bulldogs' regular season finale against Air Force, he had 452 passing yards and four touchdowns in the 48–15 victory. In the 2012 season, he passed for 4,104 yards, 37 touchdowns, and seven interceptions. He won the MWC Offensive Player of the Year for the 2012 season. Like the previous season, his passing totals were among the Mountain West Conference leaders in numerous categories.

2013 season

Carr helped lead the Bulldogs to a 11–2 record in the 2013 season. The 11 wins marked the most for the Bulldogs since 2001. 

In the regular season opener, Carr completed 52 passes on 73 attempts for 456 yards, five touchdowns, and one interception in a 52–51 victory over Rutgers. Carr's pass attempts and completions in the game set new school and conference records. Following a win over Cal Poly in the next game, Carr passed for 460 yards and four touchdowns in a victory over Boise State to move the Bulldogs to a 3–0 mark. After a victory over Hawaii in the fourth game, Carr reeled off two consecutive games with over 400 passing yards in two victories. In that stretch was a five-touchdown game against Idaho and a four-touchdown game against UNLV. The Bulldogs moved to a 7–0 mark following a victory over San Diego State on October 26. The month of November marked a start of impressive games statistically for Carr. Against Nevada, he had 487 passing yards and three touchdowns in the victory on November 2. The next week, he had 360 yards and four touchdowns in a victory over Wyoming.  Two weeks later, he had 522 passing yards and seven touchdowns in a victory over New Mexico to move the Bulldogs to a 10–0 record. In that stretch, the Bulldogs earned as high of a ranking of 15 in the AP Poll, their highest since 2001. On November 29, Carr passed for 519 yards, six touchdowns, and one interceptions as the Bulldogs dropped their first game, a 62–52 shootout, to San Jose State. Fresno State qualified for the MWC Championship Game. Against Utah State, Carr passed for 404 yards, three touchdowns, and two interceptions in the 24–17 victory. The victory marked the first time Fresno State won the conference outright. He finished his collegiate career with 217 passing yards, two touchdowns, and one interception in a 45–20 loss to USC in the Las Vegas Bowl.

In the 2013 season, Carr led the FBS with 5,083 yards and 50 touchdowns. He was among the leaders in many passing categories in the conference. He won the Sammy Baugh Trophy, which is awarded annually by the Touchdown Club of Columbus to the nation's top collegiate passer. He finished in eighth place in the Heisman Trophy voting. 

Carr received the 2013 CFPA Elite QB Award for his performance over three seasons at Fresno State. He joined fellow Bakersfield native Phillip Thomas as the school's second CFPA winner.

While at Fresno State, he wore number 4 as a homage to his favorite NFL player, Brett Favre. Carr's number was retired by Fresno State during halftime of a game against Incarnate Word in 2017. On July 14, 2019, Carr received a mural at his former college, Fresno State University.

College statistics

Professional career

Oakland / Las Vegas Raiders

2014 season
Carr was selected by the Oakland Raiders in the second round of the 2014 NFL Draft with the 36th overall pick. He was the fourth quarterback to be selected that year. On May 16, he was assigned his requested number of 4. On May 21, he was signed to a four-year, $5.37 million contract with a $2.2 million signing bonus.

On August 28, Carr impressed the coaches and fans in the Raiders' fourth and final preseason game against the Seattle Seahawks, after coming into the game as the backup to Matt Schaub and taking the Raiders down the field for three touchdowns in the first quarter, then throwing another touchdown on their next possession of the second quarter, before being relieved. For his short playing time in the game, he went 11-of-13 for 143 yards and three touchdowns for a nearly perfect quarterback rating.

On September 1, Raiders head coach Dennis Allen announced that Carr would start over Schaub in the team's opener against the New York Jets, and mentioned that the decision was not week-to-week; Carr would be the Raiders starting quarterback moving forward. Carr therefore became the first rookie quarterback in Raiders history to start a season opener, and was also the only rookie quarterback from the 2014 draft class to start in Week 1.

Carr made his first career regular-season start against the Jets on September 7. During his professional debut, he passed for 151 yards and two touchdowns. The Raiders were unsuccessful during his debut and lost by a score of 19–14. In Week 4 against the Miami Dolphins at Wembley Stadium, Carr left the game due to a high ankle sprain and MCL sprain. He was relieved by Matt McGloin, but the Raiders still couldn't find their momentum, losing to the Dolphins, 38–14.

On October 12, in the fifth start of his career versus the division-rival San Diego Chargers, Carr made history by setting a new Raiders franchise record for the most passing touchdowns in a single regular-season game by a rookie with four. This surpassed the previous record of three passing touchdowns, which was set by McGloin during his rookie season in 2013 versus the Houston Texans. Additionally, Carr set single-game personal records for passing yards by throwing for 282 yards, and for total passer rating which amounted to 107.7. Although Carr had a career day, the Raiders ultimately were defeated by the San Diego Chargers by the final score of 31–28.

On November 20, Carr won his first NFL game by leading the previously winless Raiders to a 24–20 upset win over the Kansas City Chiefs on Thursday Night Football. The Raiders trailed the Chiefs, 20–17, early in the fourth quarter, but Carr led them on an 80-yard drive that lasted just over 7 minutes. The fourth-quarter comeback ended with Carr throwing a game-winning touchdown pass that put them up, 24–20, with just under 1:40 to play. The Raiders would go on to get their first victory of the season. On December 7, Carr led the Raiders to a 24–13 victory over the visiting San Francisco 49ers. Carr posted a 140.2 rating, the highest for a Raiders quarterback since Rich Gannon in 2001.

Carr finished his rookie season with 3,270 passing yards, 21 touchdowns, and 12 interceptions. He became the first Raiders quarterback to start all 16 games since Rich Gannon in 2002.

2015 season

On September 13, during the Raiders' season opener against the Cincinnati Bengals, Carr exited the game early with an injury to his throwing hand. The MRI was negative and Carr returned to start in Week 2 against the Baltimore Ravens. The Raiders won 37–33 to get their first win of the season. Carr had a career day against the Ravens as he threw over 350 yards and three touchdowns, including the game-winning touchdown to wide receiver Seth Roberts with 26 seconds remaining. Carr continued his successful play into Week 3 against the Cleveland Browns. He threw for 314 yards as he helped lead the Raiders to a 27–20 win. Carr had another good performance in Week 7 on the road against the San Diego Chargers as he threw for 289 yards and three touchdowns, putting up a 137.7 passer rating. Carr threw for 333 yards and four touchdowns and a 130.9 passer rating in a win against the New York Jets the next week. Carr finished the 2015 season with 3,987 passing yards, 32 touchdowns, and 13 interceptions as the Raiders went 7–9.

On January 20, it was announced that he would be replacing Aaron Rodgers of the Green Bay Packers for the 2016 Pro Bowl. He became the first Raiders quarterback to be named to the Pro Bowl since Rich Gannon in 2002. After two seasons, Carr had 53 career touchdown passes, the second most by a quarterback in his first two seasons, behind Dan Marino's 68. Carr was ranked 100th by his fellow players on the NFL Top 100 Players of 2016.

2016 season

Carr started the 2016 season off strong with 319 passing yards, a touchdown, and a late go-ahead two-point conversion in a 35–34 victory over the New Orleans Saints. During Week 8 against the Tampa Bay Buccaneers, Carr finished with 513 passing yards, a franchise record, and four touchdowns as the Raiders won 30–24 in overtime. He earned his first AFC Offensive Player of the Week honor for his performance against the Buccaneers. In a Week 9 game against the defending Super Bowl champion Denver Broncos, Carr led the Raiders to a 30–20 victory on Sunday Night Football to take sole possession of first place in the AFC West. During Week 11 against the Houston Texans at Estadio Azteca, Carr completed 21 of 31 pass attempts for 295 yards and three touchdowns as the Raiders won 27–20. He surpassed 10,000 career passing yards and helped the Raiders take back sole possession of the division lead from the Kansas City Chiefs. The following week versus the Carolina Panthers, Carr dislocated his pinkie on his throwing hand and had to miss a series. He returned the next drive with a glove on his hand and finished the game, which resulted in a 35–32 victory. The win brought the Raiders to a 9–2 record and clinched their first winning season since 2002. On December 18, with a 19–16 win over the San Diego Chargers, Carr led the Raiders to clinch their first playoff berth since 2002. Carr was named to his second consecutive Pro Bowl on December 20, 2016, but an injury sustained in Week 16 prevented him from participating.

On Christmas Eve, in Week 16, Carr left the Raiders' eventual 33–25 win against the Indianapolis Colts in the fourth quarter with a leg injury. Head coach Jack Del Rio announced after the game that Carr suffered a fibula fracture from a sack by linebacker Trent Cole and that he would be out "indefinitely." The expected recovery time was six to eight weeks. Matt McGloin then started the team's final game of the regular season, but he suffered a shoulder injury and was replaced by Connor Cook, the third-string quarterback when the season began. This made Cook the starter for the first round of the playoffs. There was a small chance that Carr could return if the Raiders were able to get to Super Bowl LI, but the Raiders lost to the Houston Texans by a score of 27–14, in the Wild Card Round, ending their season. In 15 starts in the 2016 season, Carr recorded 3,937 passing yards on a career-high 357 completions and a career-low 560 attempts and 28 touchdowns. He was ranked 11th by his fellow players on the NFL Top 100 Players of 2017.

2017 season
On June 22, 2017, Carr signed a five-year, $125 million contract extension with $40 million fully guaranteed, $70 million in total guarantees and a $12.5 million signing bonus. This deal surpassed Indianapolis Colts quarterback Andrew Luck's contract as the league's highest paid player in terms of average money per year. Carr himself was surpassed that August by Detroit Lions quarterback Matthew Stafford's $27 million annual contract.

Against the Kansas City Chiefs in Week 7, Carr finished with a season-high 417 passing yards and three touchdowns. The Raiders won 31–30 on a game-winning two-yard pass from Carr to wide receiver Michael Crabtree on an untimed down that resulted from a defensive holding penalty on the previous play as time expired. During Week 15 against the Dallas Cowboys, in the closing seconds of the fourth quarter, Carr fumbled close to the endzone, resulting in a touchback, and the Raiders lost 20–17. On New Year's Eve, in the regular season finale against the Los Angeles Chargers, he threw a career-long 87-yard touchdown pass to wide receiver Amari Cooper in the 30–10 loss. Overall, in the 2017 season, the Raiders finished with a 6–10 record and missed the playoffs. Carr finished with 3,496 passing yards, 22 touchdowns, and 13 interceptions. On January 22, 2018, he was named to his third straight Pro Bowl as a replacement for the Super Bowl-bound Tom Brady. Carr was ranked 60th by his fellow players on the NFL Top 100 Players of 2018.

2018 season

Carr entered the 2018 season with a new head coach in Jon Gruden. After a 0–3 start to the season where he threw two touchdowns to five interceptions, Carr threw for 437 yards, four touchdowns, and two interceptions in a 45–42 overtime victory in Week 4 against the Cleveland Browns. In Week 15 against the Cincinnati Bengals, Carr passed for 263 yard and a touchdown in a 30–16 loss, while throwing 301 passes and breaking the franchise record for most passes without an interception. With a disappointing 4–12 record, Carr finished the season with a career-high 4,049 passing yards, a career-low 19 touchdowns, and ten interceptions.

2019 season

In Week 2, Carr threw for 198 yards and one touchdown, with two interceptions on 23 completions for 38 attempts, in a 28–10 loss to the Kansas City Chiefs. Despite the loss, Carr surpassed Hall of Famer Ken Stabler for the Raiders' franchise all-time record for passing yards. In Week 15 against the Jacksonville Jaguars, Carr threw for 267 yards and one touchdown during the 20–16 loss. This was the Raiders' final home game of the season and their last time playing at RingCentral Coliseum. During the game, Carr eclipsed 300 completed passes during the season joining Peyton Manning as the only quarterbacks to do so in each of their first six seasons. In Week 17 against the Denver Broncos, Carr threw for 391 yards and a touchdown during the 15–16 loss. Carr finished the 2019 season with 4,054 passing yards, 21 passing touchdowns, and eight interceptions as the Raiders finished with a 7–9 record. He set a franchise record for completion percentage for quarterbacks that played the whole season. He was to first Raider to eclipse 70% with 70.4%.

2020 season
In Week 1 against the Carolina Panthers, Carr finished with 239 passing yards and a touchdown in the 34–30 win, the first since the Raiders moved to Las Vegas. In Week 2, Carr finished with 282 passing yards and three touchdowns in the 34–24 win over the highly touted New Orleans Saints on Monday Night Football, the first win at Allegiant Stadium. On October 5, Carr, along with tight ends Darren Waller and Jason Witten, and seven other Raiders players, received a $15,000 fine for violating the NFL's COVID-19 protocol. The fine resulted from Carr and the other players not wearing masks at a fundraiser held by Waller's charity.
In Week 5 against the Kansas City Chiefs, Carr threw for 347 yards, three touchdowns, and one interception during the 40–32 upset road win. It was Carr's first career victory at Arrowhead Stadium, as well as his first career win against Patrick Mahomes.
In Week 11 against the Kansas City Chiefs on Sunday Night Football, Carr threw for 275 yards, three touchdowns, and one interception during the 35–31 loss.
In Week 12 against the Atlanta Falcons, Carr threw for 215 yards and an interception that was returned for a touchdown and also lost three fumbles during the 43–6 loss. In Week 13, against the New York Jets, Carr had 381 passing yards, three touchdowns, and one interception in the 31–28 victory. With the Raiders trailing by four with only 13 seconds remaining, Carr threw a go-ahead 46-yard touchdown pass to Henry Ruggs.

In a Week 15 loss to the Los Angeles Chargers, Carr left the game in the first quarter after suffering a groin injury on a goalline play.
In Week 16 against the Miami Dolphins, Carr threw for 336 yards, including an 85-yard touchdown pass to Nelson Agholor, during the 26–25 loss.
In Week 17 against the Denver Broncos, Carr threw for 371 yards, two touchdowns, and two interceptions during the 32–31 win. Overall, in the 2020 season, Carr finished with 4,103 passing yards, 27 touchdowns, and nine interceptions as the Raiders finished with an 8–8 record.

2021 season
Against the Baltimore Ravens in Week 1, Carr finished with 435 passing yards, two touchdowns, and an interception. His 33-yard touchdown to Zay Jones ended the game as the Raiders won 33–27 in overtime. Through the first three weeks of the season, Carr led the Raiders to a 3–0 start, recording 1,203 passing yards, six touchdowns, and two interceptions with a 101.4 passer rating, earning AFC Offensive Player of the Month for the month of September. Against the Philadelphia Eagles in Week 7, Carr completed 31 of 34 passes for 323 yards, two touchdowns, an interception, and finished with a 91.2 completion percentage, the second-highest in a game in NFL history (minimum 30 attempts) as the Raiders won 33–22.

Carr advanced to the playoffs after a 35–32 overtime win against the Los Angeles Chargers during the regular season finale. Carr threw for a career-high 4,804 yards, as well as 23 touchdowns and 14 interceptions on the season. He set franchise records for passing attempts, passing completions, and passing yards.

In his first career playoff start against the Cincinnati Bengals, Carr threw for 310 yards, a touchdown, but also lost a fumble and threw the game losing interception to Germaine Pratt in the 26–19 loss in the Wild Card Round. Carr was ranked 65th by his fellow players on the NFL Top 100 Players of 2022, marking his first appearance on the list in three years.

2022 season
On April 12, 2022, Carr signed a three-year, $121.5 million contract extension with the Las Vegas Raiders, including a no-trade clause. Carr became the fifth-ranked NFL quarterback in 2022 season for average annual salary ($40.5 milion) and the eighth-ranked for overall contract value. In Week 1, Carr threw for 295 yards, two touchdowns and three interceptions in a 19–24 loss to the Los Angeles Chargers. Carr's first win of the season came in Week 4 in a 32–23 win against the Denver Broncos where he threw for 188 yards and completed 21 of his 34 passes. Following the Denver game, the Raiders lost four of their next five games before rattling off a three-game winning streak.

After completing just 53.3% of his passes and throwing three interceptions in a 13-10 loss to the Pittsburgh Steelers in Week 16, Carr was benched in favor of Jarrett Stidham for the remainder of the season. With the demotion, Carr and the Raiders agreed that he would step away from the team for the rest of the season to avoid being a distraction. Prior to getting benched, Carr had started 91 consecutive regular-season games for the Raiders dating back to 2017, the longest active starting streak for the same team by a quarterback. The season was particularly frustrating for Carr and the Raiders. Nine of the eleven losses for the Raiders were by one possession, with Carr playing in ten of those losses. The Raiders became the first team in NFL history to lose five games where they had double-digit second-half leads. In 15 games in the 2022 season, Carr finished with 3,522 passing yards, 24 touchdowns, and 14 interceptions.

On January 31, it was announced that he would be replacing Joe Burrow of the Cincinnati Bengals for the 2023 Pro Bowl. 

The Raiders released Carr on February 14, 2023, following his decision to decline waiving a no-trade clause in his contract.

New Orleans Saints

2023 season
On March 6, 2023, Carr signed with the New Orleans Saints on a four-year contract.

NFL career statistics

Regular season

Postseason

Raiders franchise records
Carr holds multiple franchise records for the Raiders:

Regular season
 Most passing yards: 513 (October 30, 2016)
 Highest pass completion percentage: 91.2% (October 24, 2021)

Personal life
Carr's brother, David, was the first overall pick of the Houston Texans in the 2002 NFL Draft. David played in the NFL from 2002 to 2012 with various teams. Carr's uncle, Lon Boyett, played at the tight end position for the Raiders during the 1978 season.

Carr married his wife on June 29, 2012. The couple have three sons and a daughter. His oldest son was born with a medical condition that tied up his intestines and required three surgeries to fix.

Carr currently resides in the Southern Highlands master-planned community in the southern foothills of the Las Vegas Valley, neighbors with former Raiders coach Jon Gruden. "I absolutely love Las Vegas and I hope that they are loving our team. I hope they like what we've been able to do. Hopefully, we can do some more to give them some more great memories here in the future. But I love this place and I tell you what, man, especially the way my wife's talking, I don't think we're going to be going anywhere anytime soon."

Carr is a Christian and has said his faith is the most important thing in his life. He has tattoos on his wrists, the left citing a verse from the Biblical Book of Jeremiah and the right depicting a Chi Rho.

See also
 List of National Football League career passing yards leaders
 List of 500-yard passing games in the National Football League
 List of Division I FBS passing yardage leaders
 List of NCAA major college football yearly passing leaders
 List of NCAA major college football yearly total offense leaders
 List of family relations in American football

References

External links

 
 New Orleans Saints bio
 Fresno State Bulldogs bio

1991 births
Living people
American Conference Pro Bowl players
American football quarterbacks
Ed Block Courage Award recipients
Fresno State Bulldogs football players
Las Vegas Raiders players
New Orleans Saints players
Oakland Raiders players
Players of American football from California
Sportspeople from Fresno, California
Unconferenced Pro Bowl players